Harry Grundfest (January 10, 1904 – October 10, 1983) was an American neurologist.

He was the president of the Association of Scientific Workers, a member of the National Academy of Sciences, professor emeritus of neurology at the Columbia University College of Physicians and Surgeons, a member of the Physiological Society of London and the Japanese Physiological Society.
He was also the chairman of the American Medical Advisory Board to Hebrew University and the Hadassah Medical School.
He received the Order of the Rising Sun from the Japanese government, which is the highest award given to foreigners and seldom is given to U.S. scientists. He also received the Claude Bernard Medal of the Sorbonne, as well as the Physicians and Surgeons Distinguished Service Award from Columbia University.

References 

1904 births
1983 deaths
American neurologists
Members of the United States National Academy of Sciences
Columbia Medical School faculty